Mevlanzade Rifat Bey (1869 in Constantinople – 1930 in Aleppo), was an Ottoman-Kurdish journalist and poet, his family originated from Süleymaniye and were decedents of Khâlid-i Shahrazuri.

Early life and family 
Mevlanzade's grandfather was called Mehmed Bey he was one of the notable personages of Süleymaniye and descended from Khâlid-i Shahrazuri, Mevlanzade's father was Abdurrahman Nacim Efendi who was born in the Şehrizor district of Süleymaniye, Abdurrahman entered into the Ottoman civil service and became head of Diyarbakır Province Court and later head of the Beirut Court of Appeals, he was also a poet and died in Harpoot in 1895. Mevlanzade's wife was Nuriye Ulviye Mevlan Civelek.

Journalism and exile 
Mevlanzade Rifat Bey was one of the most notable and widely read journalists of the Ottoman Empire. He was the owner and editor in chief of Serbestî and friend of the slain journalist Hasan Fehmi. He spent most of his life in exile including France, Yemen, Egypt, Syria and Greece. An opponent of Abdul Hamid II he was initially a member of the Young Turk central committee but later one of its most ardent critics and later a member of the Freedom and Accord Party. He was among the few public figures in the Ottoman state who condemned CUP policies against the Armenians, noting that the deportations carried out were systematically planned by the Young Turk as a means to solving the Armenian question by genocide.

Mevlanzade also opposed Mustafa Kemal Atatürk and was named as one of the 150 personae non gratae of Turkey.

He was an opponent in three different periods, firstly against Abdul Hamid II, secondly against Committee of Union and Progress and thirdly against Mustafa Kemal Atatürk.

Kurdish nationalism 
He extensively lobbied the British, French and Greeks for support in establishing an independent Kurdistan. He met with Dimitrios Gounaris to this end. Mevlanzade was also a prominent member of the Society for the Elevation of Kurdistan and defended the Fourteen Points by Woodrow Wilson according to which all nationalities rights within the Ottoman Empire are to be considered.

Mevlanzade Rifat also acted as the liaison between the Kurds in Khoybun and the Armenians. He was close friend of Celadet Bedir Khan and Süreyya Bedir Khan whose articles he published.

He was the official spokesmen of the Society for the Elevation of Kurdistan president Abdulkadir Ubeydullah.

References

Kurdish people from the Ottoman Empire
Kurdish politicians
1869 births
1930 deaths
Journalists from Istanbul
Writers from Istanbul